Nelson County High School is a public high school located in Bardstown, Kentucky. Until 2012, it was the only high school in the Nelson County School District, and was by far the largest of the four high schools then located in Bardstown (one public and operated by the Bardstown city school district, one Roman Catholic, and one Protestant). In its final year as the county district's only high school, it had 1,435 students.

The school's attendance zone split with the 2012 opening of Thomas Nelson High School, located in an unincorporated part of the county that has a Bardstown mailing address.

Notes and references

Buildings and structures in Bardstown, Kentucky
Public high schools in Kentucky
Schools in Nelson County, Kentucky
Educational institutions established in 1969
1969 establishments in Kentucky